Agriotherium is an extinct genus of bears whose fossils are found in Miocene through Pleistocene-aged strata of North America, Eurasia, and Africa. This long-lived genus persisted from at least ~11.6–2.5 Mya. Materials from the late-surviving A. africanum in Africa have suggested that A. africanum died out during the early Gelasian.

Description and diet

Along with other large bears such as the cave bear, short-faced bears Arctodus and Arctotherium, and an extinct subspecies of the modern polar bear Ursus maritimus tyrannus, Agriotherium was among the largest known terrestrial members of Carnivora. They had longer legs and shorter faces than other bears, and were more lightly built. Their wide, short jaws could generate enormous bite force. It is not certain how this force was used by the living animal; a study designed to determine how the genus fed discovered that among living bears, the lowest bite force belongs to the predatory polar bear, which feeds largely on blubber, and the highest bite force belongs to the giant panda, a herbivore which uses it to crush bamboo. Shortened jaws with high bite forces are found in other mammals like Gelada baboons that eat grasses but evolved from non-grazing ancestors, and in bone-crushing scavengers, like spotted hyenas and borophagine dogs.

Analysis of the teeth, jaw, and tooth wear patterns identifies Agriotherium as an omnivore that ate a lot of plant material. Though its teeth do not show adaptations for a carnivorous diet, isotope evidence suggests it did eat a significant amount of animal material, similar to some populations of modern brown bears. Several studies of the skeleton, including a comparison with Hemicyon ursinus, a fossil bear widely accepted as a predator, show that Agriotherium did not have the limb strength or speed needed for active hunting, either by ambush or by chasing down prey. It also did not show the long claws and increased forelimb strength typical of mammals that dig for food. These very large bears may have specialized on a combination of grazing, eating fruit and invertebrate food in season, and intimidating predators away from carcasses in order to scavenge meat and bone marrow.

Very large size would have been necessary to steal and defend kills in environments dominated by some of the most powerful carnivorous mammals that have ever lived, such as the sabertooth cat Amphimachairodus, with whom it shared territory in both Afro-Eurasia and North America, and the bone-cracking canid Epicyon and the massive feliform sabertooth Barbourofelis, which it lived alongside in Texas, as evidenced by fossil deposits at Coffee Ranch. Its name was made from the Greek for "wild beast".

Fossil distribution
Sites and age of specimens:
Venta del Moro, Spain ~9–5.3 Ma.
Lang. E Quarry, South Africa ~5.3–3.6 Ma.
Vialette, Haute Loire, France ~3.2–2.5 Ma.
Middle Awash, Ethiopia ~11.6–3.6 Ma.

Agriotherium ranged widely; fossils of four or more species have been found in Europe, India, Myanmar, China, and South Africa. It is the only ursoid known to have colonized sub-Saharan Africa.

References

Sources

External links
Illustration at ScienceArt

Miocene bears
Pliocene bears
Cenozoic mammals of Europe
Cenozoic mammals of Africa
Cenozoic mammals of Asia
Cenozoic mammals of North America
Prehistoric carnivoran genera
Pleistocene bears
Pleistocene carnivorans
Pleistocene extinctions
Fossil taxa described in 1837